The Sambyeolcho Rebellion (1270–1273) was a Korean rebellion against the Goryeo dynasty that happened at the last stage of the Mongol invasions of Korea. It was suppressed by Goryeo and the Yuan dynasty. After the rebellion, Goryeo became a vassal state of the Yuan dynasty.

Background
From 1231, Goryeo was intermittently invaded by the Mongol Empire. During this time, Goryeo was controlled by a military regime led by the Choe family. In 1232 the government under the nominal king fled to Ganghwa Island, which Mongol horse riders were unable to land on, and resisted the Mongol invasion. Unfortunately because of its fragile foundation, Goryeo faced frequent rebellions. The 1258 rebellion resulted in the establishment of Ssangseong (쌍성총관부, 雙城摠管府) and Dongnyeong Prefectures (동녕부, 東寧府) by the Mongols.

Unlike these rebels, the Sambyeolcho (Three Elite Patrols) were an organ of the military government. They were organized by the Choe family to maintain security. However, unlike the Choe private guards unit (which was to personally protect the family), the Sambyeolcho assumed public functions performed by police and combat forces, effectively replacing the Six Divisions of the military.

In 1258, Choe Ui, the fourth of the Choe family, was overthrown by Kim Jun (also known as Kim Injun) using the Sambyeolcho. Kim Jun took a pro-Mongol policy and sent Crown Prince Wang Jeon to the Mongol Empire. At the same time, King Gojong and the crown prince approached the Mongols to restore power from Kim Jun. 

In 1268, however, Kim Jun was annihilated by the Sambyeolcho under the order of Im Yeon. The next year, Im Yeon's attempt to replace King Wonjong was reversed by the crown prince (Chungnyeol) with the help from the Mongol force. In 1270, Im Yeon's successor Im Yumu was killed by the pro-Mongol faction using the Sambyeolcho. It marked the end of the military regime.

Anti-Mongol struggle
By the order of the Mongol court, Wonjong moved the capital from Ganghwa Island to Kaesŏng. Regaining power from military officials with the support of the Mongols, the king decided to abolish the Sambyeolcho (삼별초, 三別抄). Resentful of the peace terms worked out with the Mongols, the Sambyeolcho, led by Bae Jungson (배중손, 裴仲孫), revolted against the government. Systematically blocking passage between Gangwha and the mainland, they brought nearby islands and coastal regions under their domain. Wang On, a royal kinsman was proclaimed king of the maritime kingdom. They gave up Ganghwa Island and fled to Jindo Island in the southwest.

Although the Sambyeolcho raided the coastlines of Jeolla Province, the southwestern province, Jin Island started to face food shortages in January 1271. In February the court of Kublai Khan's Yuan dynasty called for the Sambyeolcho's surrender. In response, its leader, Bae Jungson, asked Kublai Khan to secure Jeolla Province and put it under the direct rule of the empire, just as preceding rebels had. But his request was never fulfilled.

In April, the Yuan court decided to crush the rebels. It only took a month for Jin Island to fall to a combined Goryeo and Yuan army. The puppet king was killed and the survivors, led by Kim Tongjeong (김통정, 金通精), fled to Jeju Island. The rebels captured the island and banished the king of Tamna in November 1270.

The Sambyeolcho laid low until the end of 1271. During that time, they sought help from Japanese Kamakura Shogunate. They regained their strength to some degree the following year. They repeatedly looted the Korean coast. A combined Goryeo-Yuan assault began in February 1272, and crushed the rebels in April. Thereafter, the Yuan dynasty directly controlled Tamna until 1294.

See also
 History of Korea
 Mongol invasions of Korea
 Korea under Yuan rule

References 
Ikeuchi Hiroshi 池内宏: Kōrai no Sanbetsushō ni tsuite 高麗の三別抄について, Mansenshi kenkyū Chūsei No. 3 満鮮史研究 中世 第3冊, pp. 67–101, 1963.
Murai Shōsuke 村井章介: Kōrai, Sanbetsushō no hanran to Mōko shūrai zen'ya no Nihon 高麗・三別抄の叛乱と蒙古襲来前夜の日本, Ajia no naka no chūsei Nihon アジアのなかの中世日本, pp. 144–188, 1988.
Schultz, Edward J., Generals and Scholars - Military Rule in Medieval Korea, University of Hawaii Press, Honolulu, 2000, pp. 63–65 

 

13th-century rebellions
Goryeo
Rebellions in Asia
Wars involving Goryeo
1270s conflicts
1270s in Asia
1270 in Asia
1273 in Asia
History of Jeju Province
13th century in Korea
1271 in Asia
1272 in Asia